The 1992 United States presidential election in Rhode Island took place on November 3, 1992, as part of the 1992 United States presidential election. Voters chose four representatives, or electors to the Electoral College, who voted for president and vice president.

Rhode Island was won by Governor Bill Clinton (D-Arkansas) with 47.04% of the popular vote over incumbent President George H. W. Bush (R-Texas) with 29.02%. Businessman Ross Perot (I-Texas) finished in third, with 23.16% of the popular vote. Clinton ultimately won the national vote, defeating incumbent President Bush.

Results

By county

See also
 United States presidential elections in Rhode Island

References

Rhode Island
1992
1992 Rhode Island elections